Joseph N. Bukant (October 31, 1915 – February 9, 2007) was an American football fullback who played for five seasons in the National Football League (NFL). After playing college football for Washington University in St. Louis, he was drafted by the Philadelphia Eagles in the third round of the 1938 NFL Draft. He played for the Eagles from 1938 to 1940, and for the Chicago Cardinals from 1942 to 1943.

College career
Bukant played college football for the Washington University Bears, where he earned two-time all-Midwest and all-Missouri Valley Conference honors. Bukant also earned AP honorable mention All-American in 1935. He also lettered in track and field. He was inducted into the Washington University Bears Hall of Fame in 1993.

Professional career
Bukant was drafted by the Philadelphia Eagles in the third round of the 1938 NFL Draft. He was signed to a contract by the team on July 21, 1938. In his three seasons with the Eagles, he played in all 33 games. As a rookie, he started one game and had 48 rushing attempts for 119 yards, as well as one completed pass for 14 yards. In his second season in 1939, he had three starts, 59 rushes for 136 yards, and three touchdowns. He also punted once for 54 yards. In 1940, he started in four games, rushed 18 times for 50 yards and a touchdown, caught one pass for 13 yards, punted fifteen times for a total of 568 yards, and intercepted a pass for 10 yards.

After being inactive with an injury throughout the entire 1941 season, Bukant was traded to the Chicago Cardinals on July 26, 1942, in exchange for halfback Hugh McCullough. In Chicago, Bukant was reunited with his college coach Jimmy Conzelman. In 1942, Bukant rushed 17 times for 34 yards and went 4-of-15 passing for 56 yards and two interceptions. In 1943, he had 42 rushes for 87 yards and went 14-of-40 passing for 109 yards, one touchdown, and five interceptions. He also had five punts for 181 yards.

Military career
After the 1943 NFL season ended, Bukant joined the United States Navy in order to serve in World War II. After training at the Great Lakes Naval Training Center, where he played for the Great Lakes Bluejackets service team, he was transferred to the United States Naval Training Center Bainbridge, Maryland in June 1944. He was transferred again to Camp Peary in Williamsburg, Virginia, in August 1944, where he played on the service team in 1944.

References

1915 births
2007 deaths
People from Sangamon County, Illinois
Players of American football from Illinois
American football fullbacks
Washington University Bears football players
Philadelphia Eagles players
Chicago Cardinals players
United States Navy personnel of World War II